Edwin John "Cy" Pieh (September 29, 1886 – September 12, 1945) was a Major League Baseball pitcher who played from  to  with the New York Yankees. He batted and threw right-handed. His nickname "Cy" is short for "Cyclone" because his corkscrew style of pitching was said to look like came out of a cyclone.

He was born in Waunakee, Wisconsin, and his family moved to Enderlin, North Dakota when he was a child. He died in Jacksonville, Florida and was buried in Enderlin.

References

External links

Major League Baseball pitchers
Baseball players from Wisconsin
New York Yankees players
Lethbridge Miners players
Brandon Angels players
Edmonton Eskimos (baseball) players
Dayton Veterans players
Newark Indians players
Columbus Senators players
San Antonio Bronchos players
Scranton Miners players
Mobile Sea Gulls players
Newark Bears (IL) players
Kitchener Beavers players
London Tecumsehs (baseball) players
People from Waunakee, Wisconsin
People from Enderlin, North Dakota
1886 births
1945 deaths